is a series of Japanese horizontal shoot'em up video games originally developed for Windows by Digital Cute.

It was originally released as a minigame within , an adult life simulation game. The title name comes from a combination of the words "Buruma" (bloomers) and "Nya" (meow). All playable characters are moe anthropomorphization of a cat, and all bosses are the same of a mouse.

GamePlay
The game system is generally a typical horizontal-scrolling shooters. It has three actions; moving the player's character, shooting and the bomb. The player's bullet power increases during the player is close to enemy's bullet. At the Easy or Normal difficulty level, the speed of enemy's bullets also becomes slower. In the Story mode, the game inserts scenes of dialogue between the protagonist and a boss character or thoughts of the protagonist. When  is selected, a hentai scene is inserted in the end of each stage.

Games

Soreyuke! Burunyan-man
The first game of the series was released as a minigame within Musumaker released for Windows on December 19, 2008.

Soreyuke! Burunyan-man Hardcore!!!

 was released on download stores on January 27, 2012.

Soreyuke! Burunyan-man Portable

 is a PlayStation Portable port of the Hardcore version.

Changes include the introduction of new playable character  joined., removal of Dark-Burunyan-man and hentai scenes.

Reception

Famitsu reviewers awarded the Portable version a 28/40.

Soreyuke! Burunyan-man ECSTASY!!!

  was based on the Hardcore game, but added elements from Portable version and added hentai scenes.

In the new "Ecstasy" mode, combo system, breaking effect, new enemies and stages were added. Some enemies attack patterns were refreshed.

Go Go Burunyanman Ecstasy!!! Steam-Edition

Released on Steam in April 2016, it is a version of Burunyan-man ECSTASY!!! without adult contents.

References

External links
DigitalCute site: Burunyan-man Hardcore!!!, Burunyan-man ECSTASY!!! 
Alchemist site: Burunyan-man Portable
Steam Greenlight :: Go Go Burunyanman Ecstasy!!! Steam-Edition

Scrolling shooters
Bishōjo games
Eroge
Windows games